The Jalaid (Khalkha-Mongolian: Жалайд/Jalaid) are a Southern Mongol subgroup in Jalaid Banner, in China.  They are descendants of the Jalair Mongols.

See also 
 Jalairs
 Demographics of China
 List of medieval Mongolian tribes and clans
 Southern Mongolian dialect

Mongols
Southern Mongols